Lisa Chesson (born August 18, 1986) is an American ice hockey defender, currently playing for the Buffalo Beauts of the Premier Hockey Federation (PHF).

Playing career

Early career 
Chesson attended Plainfield Central High School in Plainfield, Illinois. She went on to play ice hockey for four years at Ohio State University, scoring 89 points in 145 games.

Professional 
Chesson played professionally for the NWHL's Buffalo Beauts for three seasons, between 2016 and 2019, winning the Isobel Cup in 2017. She participated in the 3rd NWHL All-Star Game and the 2019 NWHL All-Star Game.

In May 2019, she joined the newly formed PWHPA, and would spend the entire season with the organisation.

In April 2020, she left the PWHPA to rejoin the Beauts for the 2020–21 NWHL season.

International career 
Chesson was a member of the United States hockey team which placed second in the 2007 edition of the 4 Nations Cup. She was named to the United States women's ice hockey team for the 2010 Winter Olympics, winning a silver medal. She played for the US at the 2009, 2012, and 2013 IIHF Women's World Championships, scoring a total of seven points in fifteen games, winning gold twice and silver once.

Career Statistics

References

External links
 
 Lisa Chesson's U.S. Olympic Team bio
  
 

1986 births
American women's ice hockey defensemen
Ice hockey players from Illinois
Ice hockey players at the 2010 Winter Olympics
Living people
Medalists at the 2010 Winter Olympics
Ohio State Buckeyes women's ice hockey players
Olympic silver medalists for the United States in ice hockey
People from Plainfield, Illinois
Professional Women's Hockey Players Association players
Buffalo Beauts players
Isobel Cup champions